ANTEL is Uruguay's government-owned telecommunications company, founded in 1974 as a separate legal entity after spinning off the telecommunications division of UTE, which had the monopoly of landline telephony since 1931. The company has a monopoly of landline telephony and data services in the country. They also provide mobile phone services (in direct competition with Claro and Movistar) and Internet-related services, being the only provider of ADSL and land-line data services because of the monopoly situation.

History 
In 1992, under the presidency of Luis Alberto Lacalle, a privatization of all government-owned companies was attempted. However, a later referendum revoked the privatizations law, being Pluna the only company to be successfully privatized to Varig.  Antel enjoys a monopoly on land lines in Uruguay.

As of 2008 ANTEL's monopoly status also forbids cable operators even in larger cities, such as Montevideo, to provide data services (Internet) or voice services along with their cable service.

Antel started deploying fiber to the home in Montevideo in 2012, aiming to switch 240,000 clients that year with a cost of US$180 million. Previous DSL subscribers keep their contract, or may switch to faster Internet Vera plans: 150/12 Mbit/s for US$72/month, 120/12 Mbit/s for $61/month, 60/10 Mbit/s for $49/month, or 30/4 Mbit/s for $32/month, throttled back to 10% of those speeds after a 700 / 350 / 400 / 150 GB cap. IP television, voice over IP and connections in the department capitals are expected for 2013 and 2014.

Telecommunications tower 

ANTEL owns Uruguay's tallest skyscraper, the Telecommunications Tower, which has 160 meters and 35 floors. It is the tallest building in the country. It was designed by architect Carlos Ott. It is situated by the side of Montevideo's bay.

Satellite telecommunications 
Uruguay installed its first satellite earth station in 1985 followed by two Intelsat earth stations in 1990. ANTEL, the Aeronautics and Space Research and Diffusion Center and the UdelaR launched the first national satellite for telecommunications in June 2014, the Antelsat.

Private competition 
Antel has been granted monopoly power over most forms of communication carriage in Uruguay, except for wireless voice (mobile only), wireless internet service, wireless broadcast TV and cable TV.

In early August 2016 the Uruguayan supreme court issued a ruling in favor of cable TV company Monte Cablevideo S.A., declaring unconstitutional the law that made it unlawful for cable TV companies to offer Internet service. If this stood, it would represent an historic opening of the hitherto rigidly controlled Uruguayan wired Internet market, a sort of fall of the Berlin Wall in Uruguayan telecom. It would mean that for the first time in Uruguayan history consumers would have a choice of providers when ordering wired Internet service. It would also mean that Uruguay would join the almost unanimous majority of nations in the Americas where cable-delivered Internet is on the menu of Internet access choices (Cuba would be the only remaining holdout.) At the end of August 2016 the supreme court issued a second similar ruling on the same matter, this time authorizing a different cable company - Nuevo Siglo - to provide the services in question (the Uruguayan legal system does not make the ruling in favor of a company apply to all other companies in that situation.) Nevertheless, for almost 7 years after those supreme court rulings cable TV companies continued to be precluded by the government from offering Internet services in Uruguay. But in June 2022 the government of Luis Lacalle Pou announced it would authorize selected cable companies to start providing Internet service, a historical reversal which would effectively bust Antel's erstwhile monopoly on wired Internet services.

For information on specific competitors to Antel in the services where competition is allowed, see Telecommunications in Uruguay

Financial Performance 
(All US$ figures for FY2011 performance were calculated using 12/31/11 exchange rate of 1 dollar = 19.903 Uruguayan pesos.)

For the fiscal year ending Dec 31, 2011, Antel had revenues of US$899,361,905 (17,897,790,000 Uruguayan pesos). This represents 2% of Uruguay's 2011 GDP, putting Antel in the exclusive league of Uruguayan mega-corporations, with a share of the economy slightly higher than that of Chevron in the US. Calculated on a per-capita basis, in 2011 Antel collected US$267 of revenue per inhabitant of Uruguay (for comparison purposes the minimum monthly wage of Uruguay as of 2011 was US$300) In FY 2011 Antel had net profit of US$155,630,000 (3,097,523,000 Uruguayan pesos), or 17.3% of revenues.

Controversies 
Antel has been involved in high profile and somewhat controversial investments , notably a) the purchase of the Telecommunications Tower (Montevideo), the most expensive corporate headquarters in Uruguay for US$102,000,000 and b) more recently (April 2013) the announcement of a planned investment of US$40,000,000 in a sports arena.

In 2020, the LGBT film festival Llamale H sued Antel because the company didn't allow the storage of the festival contents, alleging that they don't fit the values of the company. The LGBT collective denounced discriminatory behavior by Antel.

References

External links 

ANTEL
https://iie.fing.edu.uy/investigacion/grupos/lai/

Telecommunications companies of Uruguay
Government-owned companies of Uruguay
Economy of Montevideo
Companies based in Montevideo
Uruguayan brands